Johrenia is a genus of herbaceous plants of the family Apiaceae.

Taxonomy 
The genus was described by Augustin Pyramus de Candolle in 1829. The type species is Johrenia dichotoma.

Species 
Below is a list of species of the genus Johrenia accepted by Plants of the World Online as of December 2022.
Johrenia anatolica (Pimenov & Kljuykov) Menemen
Johrenia dichotoma DC.
Johrenia distans (Griseb.) Halácsy
Johrenia polyscias Bornm.
Johrenia selinoides Boiss. & Balansa
Johrenia tortuosa (Fisch. & C.A.Mey.) D.F.Chamb.

References 

Apioideae
Apioideae genera